Tomorrow Times Seven is a collection of science fiction stories by American writer Frederik Pohl, first published by Ballantine Books in July 1959.

Contents
 "The Haunted Corpse" (Galaxy Science Fiction, January 1957)
 "The Middle of Nowhere" (Galaxy Science Fiction, May 1955)
 "The Gentle Venusian" (also known as "The Gentlest Unpeople", Galaxy Science Fiction June 1958)
 "The Day of the Boomer Dukes" (Future #30, 1956)
 "Survival Kit" (Galaxy Science Fiction, May 1957)
 "The Knights of Arthur" (Galaxy Science Fiction, January 1958)
 "To See Another Mountain" (The Magazine of Fantasy & Science Fiction'', April 1959)

References

1959 short story collections
Short story collections by Frederik Pohl
Ballantine Books books